This is a list of Ole Miss Rebels football players in the NFL Draft.

Key

Selections

Notable undrafted players
Note: No drafts held before 1920

References

Ole

Ole Miss Rebels NFL Draft